Georgiaville is a village in Smithfield, Providence County, Rhode Island, United States. The village was named after the Georgia Cotton Manufacturing Company mill located in the area.  The Georgiaville Pond Beach is located in the village and is a popular recreation spot.  In the 1920s the Ku Klux Klan was active in the area, and Klan rallies were held in Georgiaville. The village, which has retained many features of its origin as a mid-19th century mill village including the mill complex and several blocks of mill worker housing, was added to the National Register of Historic Places in 1985.  Georgiaville is also where Smithfield's town hall is located.

See also 
 National Register of Historic Places listings in Providence County, Rhode Island

References

External links
Georgiaville History
Georgiaville Beach

Historic districts in Providence County, Rhode Island
Villages in Providence County, Rhode Island
Providence metropolitan area
Villages in Rhode Island
Smithfield, Rhode Island
Historic districts on the National Register of Historic Places in Rhode Island
National Register of Historic Places in Providence County, Rhode Island